Robert John Maguire  (born 14 September 1934) is an Australian Roman Catholic priest, community worker and media personality from South Melbourne. From 1973 to 2012, Maguire was parish priest of Sts Peter and Paul's Church in South Melbourne. Commonly known as "Father Bob", Maguire was appointed a Member of the Order of Australia in 1989 "for service to homeless youth through the Open Family Foundation".

A 102-minute documentary, In Bob We Trust, about Maguire's life and retirement was released in October 2013.

Early life
Maguire was born in 1934, the son of a violent alcoholic father, James Maguire, who migrated from Glasgow in 1922. His mother, Annie (née McLaughlin), from Edinburgh, was usually the subject of her husband's beatings, which frequently left her "cut, bloodied and bruised". Maguire was the youngest of four children. His only memory of his father taking any notice of him was when "he'd been away and when he came home, he beat me with his belt". His eldest sibling was Eileen, then Kathleen, then James (Jim) who was eight years older than him, the last child. The family had to move house a number of times when all of the rent money was spent on drink. James Maguire was often found unconscious in the street and his son Jim had to drag or carry him back home. Sometimes their father drank Bay Rum, an aftershave lotion. The family was very poor, and the young Maguire had to borrow his brother's old services overcoat to hide the holes in the clothes he wore to school, and he rarely had socks. He "looked up to his long-suffering mum" and saw her as a "model of Christian piety".

Maguire attended Our Lady of Lourdes Catholic Primary School in Armadale from 1940 to 1947. He became an altar boy when he turned eight. In 1945, when he was 11, his sister Kathleen died from tuberculosis.

Maguire received a scholarship from the RSL to attend the private school Christian Brothers College, St Kilda, from 1948 to 1953. His father died from lung cancer the year he started school there. His mother died in 1950, aged 61, leaving Maguire orphaned at 15.

Priesthood
Maguire studied theology at Corpus Christi College, Melbourne, where he received his training for the priesthood, beginning in 1953 when he was 18. During this time he was a beekeeper, which he describes as "one of the finest periods of my life". He was ordained on 24 July 1960 at the age of 25.

In 1965, Maguire joined the Australian Army Reserve. During the Vietnam War era, as a lieutenant colonel, he was commanding officer of the Character Training Unit for young officers.

From 1973 to 2012, Maguire was parish priest of Sts Peter and Paul's Church in South Melbourne.

The Father Bob Maguire Foundation began in 2003 "in an attempt to gather all my social investments together under one Board of Governance". The "Bob Squad" is the Father Bob Maguire Foundation's volunteer fundraising and welfare provision arm which is styled on and inspired by Maguire's sense of revolutionary approach to social justice. Its slogan is "Viva La Bob" and makes many social and pop culture remarks that align it with the fighting spirit of freedom revolutionaries such as Che Guevara and Martin Luther King Jr. In the mid-1980s, Maguire started Open Family Australia, providing aid to the street children of Melbourne.

Media work
Maguire hosted a radio show on Melbourne radio station 3AW.

He made a guest appearance on the SBS television program John Safran vs God with the Melbourne satirist and documentarian John Safran. From November 2005 to January 2006, he joined Safran as co-host of Speaking in Tongues on SBS television.

He was a co-host of Sunday Night Safran on Australian national youth radio station Triple J on Sunday nights. His popularity has seen Maguire accumulate more than 120,000 followers on Twitter.

In October 2009 Maguire started working as a judge for the public speaking contest Strictly Speaking, which aired in late 2010. He joined other judges including Jean Kittson and host Andrew Hansen.

Community work
Maguire remains active in community work, as the Chairman of The Fr Bob Maguire Foundation. The Foundation operates within the City of Port Phillip and currently distributes more than 2,500 hot meals each month. The Foundation is engaged in the local community as a grass roots organisation.

He is currently the patron of Dance World, a local dance studio that offers scholarships and opportunities to local children. Maguire was previously chairman of Open Family and involved in Emerald Hill Mission, having been an integral part of the establishment of both organisations. According to Maguire, the most important funeral he has ever conducted was that of Victor Peirce.

Retirement
On 7 September 2009, Maguire announced on his blog that he had been contacted by church authorities and asked to tender his resignation on his upcoming 75th birthday. He replied with a public announcement that he would leave the decision of whether he should stay or go to his congregation. Maguire was finally forced to retire at age 77. He held his last church service on 29 January 2012 at Sts Peter and Paul's Church in South Melbourne. It was reported as standing room only with at least 1,000 in attendance.

Maguire's life and forced retirement was the subject of the 2013 documentary In Bob We Trust, directed by Lynn-Maree Milburn. The documentary premiered at the Melbourne International Film Festival on 27 July 2013. He continued his work at radio station Triple J until the end of 2015.

Honours and awards
Maguire was named the 2011 Victorian of the Year, He was a finalist for Senior Australian of the Year in 2011 and 2016. He was awarded an Honorary Fellowship by Monash University in 2011.

References

External links
 Fr Bob Maguire Foundation
 Maguire's blog
 Maguire's podcast site
 Facebook page
 Sunday Night Safran on Triple J
 Speaking In Tongues official website

1934 births
Australian Army chaplains
Australian Army officers
Australian Roman Catholic priests
Living people
Members of the Order of Australia
Religious leaders from Melbourne
Triple J announcers
Australian people of Scottish descent
People educated at St Mary's College, Melbourne
People from South Melbourne